Shahab is a class of short to long-range Iranian ballistic missiles, in service since 1988.

There have been six different variants:
 Shahab-1 (1987)
 Shahab-2 (1990)
 Shahab-3 (1998)
 Shahab-4
 Shahab-5
 Shahab-6 (Toqyān)

Weapons of Iran
Ballistic missiles of Iran